Francis John Miller (born 2 November 1949) is a Scottish rock singer-songwriter and actor. 
 
Miller wrote for and performed with many recording artists and is best known for his 1977 album Full House, the singles "Be Good To Yourself", "Darlin'" and his duet with Phil Lynott on the Thin Lizzy song "Still in Love with You".

Early life 
Miller was born on Bridgeton, Glasgow, Scotland in 1949.

Career

1966–1972: Early career
Miller began singing professionally as a teenager with a Glasgow band called The Stoics. In mid 1970, he moved to London to further his career.

1972–1974: First album and collaboration with Thin Lizzy
Later in 1972, Miller signed a solo recording contract with Chrysalis Records, and recorded his first LP Once in a Blue Moon, with record producer Dave Robinson. The album was an early example of pub rock, and featured backing by the pub rock band Brinsley Schwarz. Miller received consistently good reviews, although his singles and albums were not chart hits, Chrysalis continued to invest in his talent. In 1974 Miller sang "Still in Love with You", as a duet with Phil Lynott; the song appeared on the Thin Lizzy album, Nightlife. Miller's second album High Life, was produced and partly written by Allen Toussaint and recorded in Atlanta, Georgia during 1974. Although two album tracks, "Shoorah Shoorah" and "Play Something Sweet", subsequently provided hits for Betty Wright and Three Dog Night respectively, the album was not a commercial success.

1975–1979: Subsequent albums and "Darlin'"
Miller's next album The Rock (1975) was recorded in San Francisco using the producer Elliot Mazer, who had co-produced Harvest for Neil Young. The next album Full House (1977), was produced by Chris Thomas. The lead off track "Be Good to Yourself" became Miller's first UK top 40 hit, peaking at No. 27 in the UK Singles Chart during June that year. In 1978 Miller hit the UK top 10 with the song "Darlin' ", which peaked at No. 6 on 14 October 1978. "Darlin' " also made the Billboard "Bubbling Under" chart in the US, peaking at No. 103. The next single penned by Miller "When I'm Away From You" rose to No. 42 in UK, but failed to chart in US.

During 1979, Miller wrote the opening and closing songs on the film A Sense of Freedom, as well as performing on them. He diversified into acting. During 1979 Miller starred in Peter McDougall's TV film, Just a Boys' Game, directed by John Mackenzie.

1980–1993: Rock albums and "Caledonia"
In 1980, Miller released his seventh album, Easy Money. The lead single, "Why Don't You Spend the Night", was a minor hit in Australia. Miller later re-recorded the album's closing track, "Tears", as a duet with Bonnie Tyler on her album Faster Than the Speed of Night (1983). Miller moved to Capitol Records for his next album, Standing on the Edge. It was noted by Newsday as a departure from the R&B influences on his earlier releases, sounding more like the music of rock bands Foreigner and Bad Company.

In 1985, Miller released his final studio album, Dancing in the Rain. It was produced by John Jansen, and like its predecessor, the album was noted for its rock influences. Mark Deming of AllMusic compared it to Robert Palmer's single "Addicted to Love" and said that the album sounds more "dated" than his earlier work.

In 1991, Miller recorded an excerpt of "Caledonia" for a Tennent's lager television advert. After a surge of requests from viewers, Miller recorded and released a full-length version as a single in 1992. It peaked at No. 45 on the UK Singles Chart. Later that same year, Miller recorded a second duet with Bonnie Tyler, titled "Save Your Love", for her album Angel Heart.

In 1993, Miller recorded "Why Don't You Try Me" with Sam Bettens for the Belgian film Ad Fundum. The track was produced by Ry Cooder and peaked at No. 6 on the Belgian Flanders chart. "Where Do the Guilty Go?", which also featured in the film, later peaked at No. 46.

1994–present: Illness, recovery and tribute albums
In 1994, Miller formed a new band with Joe Walsh, Nicky Hopkins and Ian Wallace. He was writing music in New York City when he suffered a brain aneurysm on 25 August 1994. Miller was unconscious for five months, and when he woke up he found himself unable to speak or sing. He spent the subsequent years in physical rehabilitation.

In September 1998, a benefit concert was held at the Queen's Hall, Edinburgh featuring Jools Holland, Paul Carrack, Bonnie Tyler and a band of musicians with disabilities. The concert was filmed as part of the BBC Television documentary series Ex-S and broadcast in 1999. The episode was titled Frankie Miller: Stubborn Kinda Fella, and it documented Miller's road to recovery. The episode was nominated for Best Regional Documentary at the Royal Television Society awards.

A number of tribute albums have since been released, including A Tribute to Frankie Miller (2003), which features covers and duets with various artists, and 100% Pure Frankie Miller (2014) by Spike of The Quireboys.

In 2006, Miller released a new studio album, Long Way Home, featuring vocals extracted from demos he recorded before his brain aneurysm. The tracks were produced by Bill Szymczyk, Will Jennings and David Naughton. Another album, Frankie Miller's Double Take, followed in 2016, featuring 19 demos remastered into duets with other artists. The album peaked at No. 11 on the Scottish Albums Chart.

In March 2022, Miller released the track "One More Step to the Rainbow" as a protest to the 2022 Russian invasion of Ukraine.

Discography

Albums

Studio albums

Live album
BBC Radio 1 Live in Concert (1994)

Compilations

Charted singles

References

Bibliography
Encyclopedia of Rock. Hardy, Phil and Laing, Dave. Schirmer Books (1988).

External links

 

 

1949 births
Living people
Scottish rock musicians
20th-century Scottish male singers
Scottish singer-songwriters
Scottish rock guitarists
Scottish male guitarists
People from Bridgeton, Glasgow
Scottish rock singers
Scottish pop singers
Musicians from Glasgow
British male singer-songwriters